Tower Street is a street in Covent Garden, in the London Borough of Camden. It runs from Earlham Street in the north to Monmouth Street in the south and is crossed only by the pedestrianised Tower Court.

Buildings
22 Tower Street is a grade II listed school, later the headquarters of Andrew Lloyd Webber's Really Useful Group but recently  converted to apartments.

References

External links 

Streets in the London Borough of Camden
Covent Garden